Ihor Serhiyovych Tyshchenko (born 11 May 1989) is a Ukrainian professional footballer who plays as a right-back.

Career

Early years
Born in Vladivostok, Russia, he has lived in Mariupol, Ukraine, since he was five.

Śląsk Wrocław
On 25 February 2016, he signed a half year contract with Polish team Śląsk Wrocław.

References

External links 
 
 Profile on Official Illlchivets Website
 
 

1989 births
Living people
Sportspeople from Vladivostok
Russian emigrants to Ukraine
Ukrainian footballers
Association football defenders
FC Mariupol players
FC Illichivets-2 Mariupol players
FC Feniks-Illichovets Kalinine players
FC Karpaty Lviv players
Arka Gdynia players
FC Olimpik Donetsk players
Śląsk Wrocław players
FC Yarud Mariupol players
Ukrainian Premier League players
Ukrainian First League players
Ukrainian Second League players
Ekstraklasa players
I liga players
Ukrainian expatriate footballers
Expatriate footballers in Poland
Ukrainian expatriate sportspeople in Poland